Turu, the Wacky Hen is a 2019 Spanish-Argentine computer-animated film directed by Eduardo Gondell and Víctor Monigote. The title comes from the popular children's song La gallina Turuleca, itself a Spanish version of the song A galinha magricela by Brazilian songwriter Edgard Poças, and popularized by Los Payasos de la Tele. The film had its world premiere at the San Sebastián International Film Festival on 21 September 2019, and was theatrically released in Spain on 1 January 2020 by Filmax and in Argentina on 14 July 2022 by Walt Disney Studios Motion Pictures under the Star Distribution label. It received mixed reviews, but won Best Animated Film at the 35th Goya Awards and 8th Platino Awards.

Premise 
A hen unable to lay eggs finds her life changed when she is sold to an old lady, who discovers the hen can sing.

Voice cast 
Eva Hache as Turuleca
José Mota as Armando Tramas
Ana Ángeles as Isabel
Álvaro de Juana Pecos as Matías
Paula Coria Portilla as Lucía
Alejandro García as Antonio
Lorenzo Beteta as Rudy
Eva Lorenzo as Nurse

Release 
Turu, the Wacky Hen had its world premiere at the San Sebastián International Film Festival in Spain on 21 September 2019, and premiered in Argentina at the Mar del Plata International Film Festival on 10 November 2019. It was theatrically released in Spain on 1 January 2020 by Filmax and it was theatrically released in Argentina on 14 July 2022 by Walt Disney Studios Motion Pictures under the Star Distribution label. The film had a worldwide gross of $1,360,825.

Critical reception 
The film received mixed reviews from critics, but won Best Animated Film at the 35th Goya Awards– as the only nominated film – and 8th Platino Awards.

References

External links 

2019 films
2019 3D films
2019 comedy films
2019 computer-animated films
2010s Argentine films
2010s Spanish films
2010s children's comedy films
2010s children's animated films
2010s musical comedy films
2010s Spanish-language films
Argentine animated films
Argentine children's films
Argentine musical comedy films
Spanish 3D films
Spanish computer-animated films
Spanish children's films
Spanish musical comedy films
Animated comedy films
Animated musical films
3D animated films
Animated films about chickens
Circus films
Films set in 2019
Films distributed by Disney